This is a list of stins in Friesland.

See also 
 List of castles in the Netherlands
 List of borgs in Groningen (province)

Stins in Friesland
 2